is located in the Hidaka Mountains, Hokkaidō, Japan. It stands at 1721m elevation, and it is the 24th highest mountain in the Hidaka Mountains.

References
 Google Maps
 Geographical Survey Institute
 Hokkaipedia

Specific

Koikakushusatsunai